William Leonard Boat (born February 2, 1966) is an American former open-wheel driver who raced in the Indy Racing League.

Racing career
Boat began his career in USAC where he won 11 straight Western Series races on his way to the 1995 championship. He won the Turkey Night Grand Prix midget car race in 1995. He was a three-peat winner in the event after winning in 1996 and 1997. He made his first IRL start in the 1997 Indianapolis 500 driving for A. J. Foyt Enterprises. In 1998 he won 6 poles, including 5 in a row, both league records, and won his first race at Texas Motor Speedway. It was his only official IRL victory. He is one of the few drivers with the distinction to have started from both the pole (1998) and final 33rd (2000, 2001) starting position in the Indy 500. He has not appeared in an IRL race since the 2003 Indianapolis 500.

Personal life
Boat is a graduate of Arizona State University. In 1986 he founded Billy Boat Performance Exhaust, a company that makes performance exhaust systems for luxury and high performance cars, light trucks, and high performance watercraft. Boat has four children, with three girls and one boy.

In 2014, Boat's son Chad began competing in the NASCAR Nationwide Series, driving a family-owned No. 84 Chevrolet.

Motorsports career results

American open–wheel racing results
(key)

Indy Lights

IndyCar Series

Indianapolis 500

NASCAR
(key) (Bold – Pole position awarded by qualifying time. Italics – Pole position earned by points standings or practice time. * – Most laps led.)

Busch Series

External links
 
 
 
 Billy Boat Performance Exhaust

Living people
1966 births
Racing drivers from Phoenix, Arizona
Indianapolis 500 drivers
Indianapolis 500 polesitters
IndyCar Series drivers
Indy Lights drivers
NASCAR drivers
Arizona State University alumni
USAC Silver Crown Series drivers
PDM Racing drivers
Team Pelfrey drivers
A. J. Foyt Enterprises drivers
Panther Racing drivers